Leprince-Ringuet is a surname. Notable people with the surname include:

 Grégoire Leprince-Ringuet (born 1987), French actor
 Louis Leprince-Ringuet (1901–2000), French physicist

See also
Leprince
Oxley (surname)

Compound surnames
French-language surnames